Hyalea glaucopidalis is a moth in the family Crambidae. It was described by Achille Guenée in 1854.

References

Moths described in 1854
Pyraustinae